The 2017–18 season was the 140th in the history of English football club Wolverhampton Wanderers and the first under former FC Porto manager Nuno Espírito Santo who was appointed on 31 May 2017. The club competed in the English Football League Championship for the fourth consecutive and final year as well as the EFL Cup and the FA Cup.

The club led the league table on 31 October with a win against Norwich City and stayed put since then, both winning the title and gaining promotion to the Premier League after a 6-year absence with a tally of 99 points, the club's highest-ever in the second tier. The club recorded a pre-tax loss of £57.16 million in its season-concluded accounts published on 5 March 2019, of which around £20 million was for bonuses paid to its staff and players for achieving Premier League promotion. It also noted a deficit of more than a £1 million per week, making the loss more than double the value from the previous financial year.

Matches

Pre-season
Wolves began their pre-season training at their training ground on 26 June 2017 before playing six friendlies, included three during a stay in Austria.

Football League Championship

A total of 24 teams competed in the EFL Championship in the 2017–18 season. Each team played every other team twice, once at their stadium, and once at the opposition's. Three points were awarded to teams for each win, one point per draw, and none for defeats. The provisional fixture list was released on 21 June 2017, but was subject to change in the event of matches being selected for television coverage or police concerns.

Results

League table

Results summary

Results by round

FA Cup

In the FA Cup, Wolverhampton Wanderers entered the competition in the third round and were drawn at home to Swansea City.

EFL Cup

Players

Statistics

|-
|align="left"|||align="left"|||align="left"| 
|||0||||0||0||0||||0||0||0||
|-
|align="left"|||align="left"|||align="left"| 
|||4||||0||0||0||||4||2||1||
|-
|align="left"|||align="left"|||align="left"| 
|||5||||0||||0||style="background:#98FB98"|||5||8||0||
|-
|align="left"|||align="left"|||align="left"|  †
|||0||||0||||0||||0||0||0||
|-
|align="left"|||align="left"|||style="background:#faecc8; text-align:left;"|  ‡
|||3||||0||||0||style="background:#98FB98"|||3||6||0||
|-
|align="left"|||align="left"|||align="left"|  
|||1||||0||||0||style="background:#98FB98"|||1||8||0||
|-
|align="left"|||align="left"|||align="left"| 
|||1||||0||||1||||2||4||1||
|-
|align="left"|||align="left"|||align="left"| 
|||9||||0||||0||||9||4||0||
|-
|align="left"|||align="left"|||align="left"|  
|||6||||0||0||0||style="background:#98FB98"|||6||11||1||
|-
|align="left"|||align="left"|||align="left"|  †
|||1||||0||||1||||2||0||0||
|-
|align="left"|||align="left"|||align="left"| 
|||0||||0||0||0||style="background:#98FB98"|||0||0||0||
|-
|align="left"|10||align="left"|||align="left"|  ¤
|||0||||0||0||0||||0||0||0||
|-
|align="left"|11||align="left"|||align="left"|  ¤
|||0||||0||||0||||0||0||0||
|-
|align="left"|12||align="left"|||align="left"|  ¤ 
|||0||||0||||0||||0||2||0||
|-
|align="left"|13||align="left"|||align="left"|  
|||0||||0||0||0||||0||0||0||
|-
|align="left"|14||align="left"|||align="left"|  ¤
|||0||||0||||0||||0||1||0||
|-
|align="left"|15||align="left"|||style="background:#faecc8; text-align:left;"|  ‡
|||3||||0||||0||style="background:#98FB98"|||3||2||0||
|-
|align="left"|16||align="left"|||align="left"| 
|||1||||0||||0||||1||4||1||
|-
|align="left"|17||align="left"|||align="left"|  
|||5||||0||||0||||5||2||0||
|-
|align="left"|18||align="left"|||style="background:#faecc8; text-align:left;"|  ‡
|||17||||1||||0||style="background:#98FB98"|||18||9||0||
|-
|align="left"|19||align="left"|||align="left"|  †
|||0||||0||||0||||0||2||0||
|-
|align="left"|19||align="left"|||style="background:#faecc8; text-align:left;"|  ‡
|||6||||0||||0||||6||0||0||
|-
|align="left"|20||align="left"|||align="left"|  ¤ 
|||0||||0||||0||||0||0||0||
|-
|align="left"|21||align="left"|||align="left"| 
|||0||||0||0||0||style="background:#98FB98"|||0||1||0||
|-
|align="left"|23||align="left"|||align="left"|  
|0||0||0||0||0||0||0||0||0||0||
|-
|align="left"|24||align="left"|||align="left"| 
|||0||||0||0||0||||0||0||0||
|-
|align="left"|25||align="left"|||align="left"|  
|||0||||0||||0||style="background:#98FB98"|||0||2||0||
|-
|align="left"|26||align="left"|||align="left"| 
|||1||||0||||1||||2||0||0||
|-
|align="left"|27||align="left"|||align="left"| 
|||4||||0||||0||||4||12||0||
|-
|align="left"|29||align="left"|||style="background:#faecc8; text-align:left;"|  ‡
|||1||||0||||0||style="background:#98FB98"|||1||0||1||
|-
|align="left"|30||align="left"|||align="left"| 
|||0||||0||||0||||0||0||0||
|-
|align="left"|31||align="left"|||align="left"|  
|||0||||0||||0||style="background:#98FB98"|||0||0||0||
|-
|align="left"|32||align="left"|||align="left"|  ¤
|||0||0||0||||0||||0||0||0||
|-
|align="left"|33||align="left"|||style="background:#faecc8; text-align:left;"|  ‡
|||12||||0||||0||style="background:#98FB98"|||12||0||0||
|-
|align="left"|34||align="left"|||align="left"| 
|0||0||0||0||0||0||0||0||0||0||
|-
|align="left"|35||align="left"|||align="left"|  ¤
|0||0||0||0||||1||||1||0||0||
|-
|align="left"|36||align="left"|||align="left"|  ¤
|0||0||0||0||0||0||0||0||0||0||
|-
|align="left"|37||align="left"|||align="left"|  ¤
|0||0||0||0||0||0||0||0||0||0||
|-
|align="left"|38||align="left"|||align="left"| 
|||1||0||0||||0||style="background:#98FB98"|||1||0||0||
|-
|}

Awards

Transfers

In

Loans in

Out

Loans out

References

2017–18 EFL Championship by team
Wolverhampton Wanderers F.C. seasons